Hamadab is an ancient city of ruins located in Sudan. It appears to have been abandoned 4th century AD. The name is borrowed from the nearby village of al Dumat Hamadab, as the ancient name of the city is initially unknown. They consist of two hills,  in width and length, one being  in height, and the other being half of that. The two hills are separated from each other within the Nile. In 1914, a temple was excavated northeast of the settlement; it included  pillars dedicated to Queen Amanirenas and her son, Akinidad. While Amun is suspected, it is unknown which god was worshiped in the temple. Other excavations have occurred since 2001. They revealed mud brick built houses surrounded by a wall.

References
 Wolf, Pawel. "Hamadab – Das Hauptquartier des Akinidad?", in Der Antike Sudan. 15, 2004, pp. 83–97, ISSN 0945-9502.

Archaeological sites in Sudan
Kingdom of Kush
Nubia